Westbury High School can refer to:

 Westbury High School (Houston) in Houston, Texas, United States
 Westbury High School (Old Westbury, New York) in Old Westbury, New York, United States
 Westbury High School (South Africa) in Johannesburg, South Africa